The Kootenai Creek Snowshoe Cabin was built in Glacier National Park in 1926. The rustic log structure comprises a single room with a woodstove, and a small cellar food cache. The cabin was situated on the patrol route from the Goat Haunt ranger station to the Fifty Mountain-Flattop region, about eight miles upstream from the ranger station. Unlike most patrol cabins, it is isolated from the park's main trail routes.

See also
Lee Creek Snowshoe Cabin

References

Park buildings and structures on the National Register of Historic Places in Montana
Residential buildings completed in 1926
Log cabins in the United States
National Register of Historic Places in Glacier County, Montana
Log buildings and structures on the National Register of Historic Places in Montana
1926 establishments in Montana
National Register of Historic Places in Glacier National Park
National Park Service rustic in Montana